Kråkeslottet was a Norwegian reality TV series that aired on TV3 during the spring of 2002. The host was Halvard Haldorsen.

The concept of the series was to follow a group of contestants who were living in an old and abandoned hotel and their attempt at refurbishing it. Every week a contestant was voted off the show.

Ratings
The show was a flop for TV3. The lowest rating was 30 000 viewers. The final episode was watched by only 64 000 viewers.

Aftermath
The eventual winner, Andre Iversen, was sued by several of the other contestants because Andre agreed to share the money with Espen Asbjørnsen, something that was against the rules.

References

External links
 Ikke mer Kråkeslottet (Norwegian)
 

TV3 (Norway) original programming
Norwegian reality television series
2002 Norwegian television series debuts
2002 Norwegian television series endings
2000s Norwegian television series